North Ealing Primary School is a community primary school founded in August 1911 and situated on Pitshanger Lane, Ealing, London.

History
By the turn of the 20th Century the population of Ealing was expanding fast, and so a program of school building was undertaken. North Ealing school was the last of the 5 state schools to be constructed during this period, on the account that most of the children in its catchment area attended private schools. The architect for this and the four others schools was the local borough surveyor and engineer Charles Jones.

Pupils
It takes in students of both genders, from ages 4 to 11. It will be completely a 3 form school by 2015. It currently has around 650+ students in total and also includes a nursery. Notable former pupils include footballer Peter Crouch and actress Honor Blackman. The uniform consists of a white/grey shirt or blouse, grey trousers, shorts, skirt or pinafore, a grey jumper or cardigan, and a blue/gold tie.
.

Results

It consistently performs above the LEA and national average.

References

External links
Official site
Ofsted: Profile of the school
Ealing Council: Information about the school
Department for Education and skills: Statistics about the school
BBC: League table for the school

Educational institutions established in 1911
Primary schools in the London Borough of Ealing
1911 establishments in England
Community schools in the London Borough of Ealing